The Hunches were a garage rock band from Portland, Oregon active from 2000 to 2009. They released three studio albums: Yes. No. Shut It (2002), Hobo Sunrise (2004), and Exit Dreams (2009), all on In the Red Records.

Discography
Yes. No. Shut It. (In the Red, 2002)
Hobo Sunrise (In the Red, 2004)
Exit Dreams (In the Red, 2009)
Home Alone 5 (In the Red, 2009)
The Hunches (Almost Ready compilation, 2016)

References

American garage rock groups
Rock music groups from Oregon
Musical groups from Portland, Oregon
Musical groups established in 2000
Musical groups disestablished in 2009
2000 establishments in Oregon
2009 disestablishments in Oregon
In the Red artists